Jagatpur is a village which is located in Bhirkot Municipality, Syangja District, Gandaki Province, Nepal.

References

External links

Syangja District
Populated places in Syangja District